Lorne Austin Davis (July 20, 1930 – December 20, 2007) was a Canadian ice hockey player, and later a scout. He played for four teams in the National Hockey League between 1951 and 1960, with the rest of his career spent in the minor leagues. After retiring he became a scout, and worked with the Edmonton Oilers from 1979 to 2008. Internationally Davis played for the Canadian national team at the 1966 World Championship, winning a bronze medal. He was born in Lumsden, Saskatchewan, but grew up in Regina, Saskatchewan.

Playing career
Davis spent most of his fifteen-year pro career playing for minor-league teams, with occasional call-ups to the Montreal Canadiens (with whom he won a Stanley Cup in 1953), Chicago Black Hawks, Detroit Red Wings, and Boston Bruins. In 1964–65, he was a player-coach for the Muskegon Zephyrs of the International Hockey League. After his retirement, he went on to coach his former junior team, the Western Hockey League's Regina Pats, and then the New York Rangers before becoming a scout for the Edmonton Oilers. He received five more Stanley Cup rings for his work as a scout of the Oilers (1984, 1985, 1987, 1988, 1990), and his name was put on the Stanley Cup in 1985, 1987, 1990. Davis remained employed by the club until his death in late 2007.

Career statistics

Regular season and playoffs

International

Awards and achievements 
AHL Second All-Star Team (1953)
Played in NHL All-Star Game (1953)
NHL - Stanley Cup (Edmonton) (1987 and 1990)

References

External links

Picture of Lorne Davis' Name on the 1990 Stanley Cup Plaque
Lorne Davis: Always looking for the next great draft pick - Obituary (National Post)
ObitTree

1930 births
2007 deaths
Boston Bruins players
Buffalo Bisons (AHL) players
Canada men's national ice hockey team coaches
Canadian expatriate ice hockey players in the United States
Canadian ice hockey coaches
Canadian ice hockey right wingers
Chicago Blackhawks players
Detroit Red Wings players
Edmonton Flyers (WHL) players
Edmonton Oilers scouts
Hershey Bears players
Ice hockey people from Saskatchewan
Montreal Canadiens players
Muskegon Zephyrs players
New York Rangers coaches
Providence Reds players
Regina Pats coaches
Regina Pats players
Sportspeople from Regina, Saskatchewan
Stanley Cup champions
Victoria Cougars (1949–1961) players
Winnipeg Warriors (minor pro) players